Afsar Amed (also written as Afsar Ahmed, 5 April 1959 – 4 August 2018) was an Indian Bengali writer. He wrote 27 novels and 24 books of other categories.

Early life and education
Amed was born on 5 April 1959. He pursued his post graduate education from Kolkata University in Bangla.

Career
During Amed's early life he wrote mainly poems but later he began to write prose. His writing Bangali Musalmaner Biyer Gan was published in Porichoy in 1978. His first novel Ghor Gerosti was published in 1980. His writings were published in Porichoy, Kalantor, Baromas, Saroswato. Besides writing he also worked in literary magazine Protikshon for some years. He worked in  Paschimbanga Bangla Akademi too.

Amed's book Bibir Mithya Talaq O Talaqer Bibi Ebong Holud Pakhir Kissa was in the school curriculum in Assam. Mrinal Sen directed Aamar Bhuban was based on his novel Dhan Jyotsna. This film was his last direction. A film titled Raat Koto Holo (2011)  directed by Sandeep Chattopadhyay (Chatterjee), produced by Satyajit Ray Film and Television Institute (SRFTI), was based on his novel Hatyar Promad Jani.

Amed also translated books of other languages into Bangla. He and Kalim Hazique translated Abdus Samad's Urdu novel Do Gaz Zamin into Bangla titled Sare Tin Hat Bhumi. He also translated a Sindhi book of Hari Motwani into Bangla. The title of the translated book was Ashroy.

Selected bibliography

Novels
 Ghor Gerosti
 Sanu Alir Nijer Jomi
 Atmoporichoy
 Byatha Khuje Ana
 Swapnosomvash
 Khondo Bikhondo
 Dhanjyotsna
 Bibir Mithya Talaq O Talaqer Bibi Ebong Holud Pakhir Kissa
 Sei Nikhoj Manushta
 Dwitiyo Bibi
 Ek Ashchorjo Boshikoron Kissa
 Hotyar Promad Jani
 Metiaburuze Kissa
 Ek Ghorsowar Kissa
 Hire Vikharini O Sundori Romoni Kissa

Translations
 Sare Tin Hat Bhumi
 Ashroy

Awards and recognition
Amed received Somen Chanda Puraskar from Paschimbanga Bangla Akademi in 1998. He and Kalim Hazique translated Abdus Samad's Urdu novel Do Gaz Zamin into Bengali titled Sare Tin Hat Bhumi. He was awarded Sahitya Akademi Translation Prize for this work in 2000. He also received Bankim Puraskar in 2009. He received Sahitya Akademi Award in 2017 for his novel Sei Nikhoj Manushta.

Death
Amed died on 4 August 2018 at the age of 59.

References

1959 births
2018 deaths
Bengali Hindus
20th-century Bengalis
Recipients of the Sahitya Akademi Award in Bengali
University of Calcutta alumni
People from Howrah district
Bengali-language poets
Bengali novelists
Recipients of the Sahitya Akademi Prize for Translation
Writers from Kolkata
Bengali-language writers
Indian novelists
20th-century Indian novelists
20th-century Indian male writers
20th-century Indian translators